Claudio Domingo Rivero Rodríguez (born 14 April 1985) is a Uruguayan footballer who currently plays for C.A. Rentistas as a defensive midfielder.

Career
In February 2019, Rivero joined LDU Portoviejo.

Titles
Fénix
 Uruguayan Segunda División (2): 2006–07, 2008–09

References

External links
 
 

1985 births
Living people
Uruguayan footballers
Uruguayan expatriate footballers
Centro Atlético Fénix players
Hapoel Ramat Gan F.C. players
C.D. Antofagasta footballers
Panionios F.C. players
Cienciano footballers
S.D. Quito footballers
Deportivo Pasto footballers
Defensor Sporting players
L.D.U. Portoviejo footballers
C.A. Rentistas players
Uruguayan Primera División players
Uruguayan Segunda División players
Super League Greece players
Chilean Primera División players
Categoría Primera A players
Peruvian Primera División players
Uruguayan expatriate sportspeople in Chile
Uruguayan expatriate sportspeople in Greece
Uruguayan expatriate sportspeople in Peru
Uruguayan expatriate sportspeople in Israel
Uruguayan expatriate sportspeople in Ecuador
Expatriate footballers in Chile
Expatriate footballers in Greece
Expatriate footballers in Peru
Expatriate footballers in Israel
Expatriate footballers in Ecuador
Association football midfielders